Sonique may refer to:
 Sonique (musician) (born 1965), British DJ and singer
 Sonique (media player), a media player for Windows
 Kylie Sonique Love (formerly known as Sonique, born 1983), American performer and transgender activist
 Villette Sonique, a yearly music festival in Parc de la Villette in Paris, France